Protea tenax also known as the tenacious sugarbush , is a flowering plant of the family Proteaceae endemic to South Africa and distributed in the Outeniqua, Tsitsikamma, Kouga and Winterhoek mountains as well as the Baviaanskloof. In Afrikaans it is known as Gehardesuikerbos.

Gallery

See also

References

External links

tenax
Flora of the Cape Provinces